Carabus alpherakii is a species of ground beetle in the large genus Carabus that is endemic to China.

References

alpherakii
Insects described in 1898
Insects of China